Minuscule 381 (in the Gregory-Aland numbering), Α400 and Νλ47 (Soden), is a Greek minuscule manuscript of the New Testament, on paper. Palaeographically it has been assigned to the 14th century.

Description 

The codex contains the text of the Gospel of Luke on 226 paper leaves with only one lacuna (Luke 1:1-5). It is written in one column per page, in 33 lines per page. The biblical text is surrounded by a catena.

Text 

The Greek text of the codex is a representative of the Byzantine text-type. Aland placed it in Category V.
It was not examined by the Claremont Profile Method.

History 

Scrivener and Gregory dated it to the 14th century.

The manuscript was added to the list of New Testament manuscripts by Scholz (1794–1852).
C. R. Gregory saw it in 1886.

The manuscript is currently housed at the Vatican Library (Pal. gr. 20) in Rome.

See also 

 List of New Testament minuscules
 Biblical manuscript
 Textual criticism

References

Further reading 

 

Greek New Testament minuscules
14th-century biblical manuscripts
Manuscripts of the Vatican Library